The Jaén Province is one of the thirteen provinces in the Cajamarca Region of Peru. Geographically, the province has a mountainous terrain crisscrossed by the rivers of the Huancabamba-Chamaya Basin, which drain towards the Marañón River. Its weather is characterized by high temperatures all year long and heavy rains from October through March. Agriculture and husbandry absorb over half of the province workforce. rice and coffee are main crops.

Political division
The province is divided into twelve districts.
 Jaén (Jaén de Bracamoros)
 Bellavista (Bellavista)
 Chontali (Chontali)
 Colasay (Colasay)
 Huabal (Huabal)
 Las Pirias (Las Pirias)
 Pomahuaca (Pomahuaca)
 Pucará (Pucará)
 Sallique (Sallique)
 San Felipe (San Felipe)
 San José del Alto (San José del Alto)
 Santa Rosa (Santa Rosa)

See also 
 Inka Tampu

References 
  Instituto Nacional de Estadística e Informática. Banco de Información Digital. Retrieved November 4, 2007.
  World Bank, CIPCA. Evaluación Participativa de Necesidades Prioritarias (Cajamarca - Perú). Retrieved November 4, 2007.

Provinces of the Cajamarca Region